A database dump contains a record of the table structure and/or the data from a database and is usually in the form of a list of SQL statements ("SQL dump"). A database dump is most often used for backing up a database so that its contents can be restored in the event of data loss. Corrupted databases can often be recovered by analysis of the dump. Database dumps are often published by free content projects, to facilitate reuse, forking, offline use, and long-term digital preservation.

Dumps can be transported into environments with Internet blackouts or otherwise restricted Internet access, as well as facilitate local searching of the database using sophisticated tools such as grep.

See also 
Import and export of data
Core dump
Databases
Database management system
SQLyog- MySQL GUI tool to generate Database dump
 Data portability

External links 
mysqldump — A Database Backup Program
PostgreSQL dump backup methods, for PostgreSQL databases.

Database theory